The Companies Registration Office (CRO) registers and incorporates companies in Ireland and files their annual returns.

The CRO has a number of core functions:

The incorporation of companies.
The receipt and registration of post incorporation documents.
The enforcement of the Companies Acts in relation to the filing obligations of companies.
Making information on companies available to the public.

It also registers the names of businesses which are non-limited trading entities such as sole traders and partnerships.

It also has the Office of the Registry of Friendly Societies which registers Industrial & Provident Societies, Friendly Societies and trade unions.

In 2019, the Register of Beneficial Ownership was introduced into Ireland. That was implemented on the back of the EU’s Fourth Anti-Money Laundering Directive, which essentially requires all member states to hold adequate, accurate and current information of all beneficial owners. A beneficial owner is someone who owns more than 25% of a company.

See also
 List of Irish companies
 List of company registers

References

External links
 Official site - includes company search facility

Irish business law
Registrars of companies